Kwon Soon-Hyung (born June 16, 1986) is a South Korean football player who currently plays for Seongnam FC.

He was called AN Global on January 1, 2019.

On November 18, 2008, Kwon was as one of sixteen priority member, join Gangwon FC. He played first pro league game in Incheon, April 5, 2009, but team was defeated by Incheon United.

After finishing his contract with Gangwon, Kwon joined Jeju United on December 14, 2011.

Club career statistics

References

External links
 

1986 births
Living people
South Korean footballers
Gangwon FC players
Jeju United FC players
Gimcheon Sangmu FC players
Seongnam FC players
K League 1 players
K League 2 players
Association football midfielders